Brasiliscincus caissara is a species of skink found in Brazil.

References

Brasiliscincus
Reptiles of Brazil
Endemic fauna of Brazil
Reptiles described in 1974
Taxa named by Regina Rebouças-Spieker